Lipetz House is a house in Los Angeles designed by Raphael Soriano, and built in 1936.

The building was Soriano's first residential commission, and arose from his knowledge and passion for both language and music. The main feature of the house was to be a music room with excellent acoustic properties that could accommodate Mrs. Lipetz’s Bechstein Grand piano and up to twenty guests. Soriano designed the north end of this  x  room as a semi circle with continuous windows, creating a real-life backdrop of the vast San Gabriel Mountain Range, for Lipetz's performances. The site itself is on the pinnacle of a hill overlooking Silver Lake.  Several hundred music albums were accommodated in shelves placed under built-in seating areas, and much of the other furniture in the house was also built-in. The music room comprised nearly one third of the total  area of the two-bedroom house. The design is in the International Style, built with traditional wood stud construction, similar to Richard Neutra’s frame, but with one innovate technological detail - steel beams supported the ground floor. The building was chosen as one of four U.S.A. buildings for the 1937 International Architecture Exhibition in Paris, and with it Soriano won the prestigious Prix de Rome. The house is in good condition with slight alterations.

Notes

References
“House for E. M. Lipetz, Designer, Raphael Soriano, Los Angeles, California.”  California Arts and Architecture.  58, January 1941, p. 28
“Transition 1935-1955, Architectural Design, Work of Soriano.”  Architect and Engineer.  205, May 1956, pp. 14–21
McCoy, Esther. The Second Generation. Salt Lake City, Utah.  Peregrine Smith Books, 1984 p. 146;
Jackson, Neil.  The Modern Steel House.  London: E & FN Spon, 1996. p 54;
Gebhard, David and Winter, Robert.  Los Angeles:  An Architectural Guide.  Layton:  Gibbs Smith, 1994 p. 180; Smith, Elizabeth A. T. (ed.).
Blueprints for Modern Living, History, Legacy of the Case Study Houses.  Boston and London, 1989p 102
Gebhard, D. And Von Breton, H.; Los Angeles in the Thirties 1931-1941, Hennessey & Ingalls, Inc. Los Angeles, 1989
Shulman, Julius.  Architecture and its Photography.  Köln: Taschen,  1998 p. 40,41,44
Rosa, Joseph. A Constructed View. The Architectural Photography Of Julius Shulman. New York, 1994. p. 115
Soriano, Raphael S. “Substance and Function in Architecture.”  Laskey, Marlene L. Interview. Oral History Program, University of California, Los Angeles, 1988. pp. 79–80, 85-86, 88-89, 82-94, 105-106, 141

External links

Raphael Soriano buildings
Houses in Los Angeles
Streamline Moderne architecture in California
Houses completed in 1936